Trygve Jens Asbjørn Olsen (11 November 1921 – 17 April 1979) was a Norwegian politician for the Centre Party.

He was born in Måsøy.

Trygve Olsen was the son of Parliament member Johannes Olai Olsen, but was not elected to parliament. Instead, he worked as a fisher from 1939. He was a member of the board in Norges Råfisklag from 1958 to 1966, and chairman of Fiskebåtredernes forbund from 1977 to 1979. He was the Minister of Fisheries from 1972–1973 during the cabinet Korvald.

He was active in local politics as mayor of Måsøy municipality from 1968 to 1972. During the same period he was also a member of Finnmark county council.

References

1921 births
1979 deaths
People from Måsøy
Centre Party (Norway) politicians
Government ministers of Norway
Mayors of Måsøy
Place of death missing